A flashforward is a narrative device.

Flashforward or Flash Forward may also refer to:
 FlashForward, a 2009 TV series
 Flashforward (novel), a 1999 novel by Robert J. Sawyer and the basis for the 2009 series
 Flash Forward, a 1996 Disney Channel TV series
 Flash Forward (album), a 2005 album by the Siegel-Schwall Band
 Flash Forward, a podcast produced by Rose Eveleth on the far future cultural impacts of technology
 NDE "flash forward", opposite of a life review, sometimes experienced in a near-death experience
 Flash Forward, Ltd., a joint venture between SanDisk and Toshiba Memory Corporation that manufactures flash memory